The 2016 Oregon State Beavers football team represented Oregon State University during the 2016 NCAA Division I FBS football season. The team was led by second-year head coach Gary Andersen and their home games were played on campus at Reser Stadium in Corvallis. Oregon State was a member of the North Division of the Pac-12 Conference. They finished the season 4–8, 3–6 in Pac-12 play to finish in a tie for fourth place in the North Division.

Schedule

Source:

Roster

Game summaries

at Minnesota

Idaho State

Boise State

at Colorado

California

Utah

at Washington

Washington State

at Stanford

at UCLA

Arizona

Oregon

References

Oregon State
Oregon State Beavers football seasons
Oregon State Beavers football